Nixe may refer to:
 Nixe (water spirit), in Germanic mythology
 Nixe (mayfly), a genus of insects
 SMS Nixe, a German ship
 Operation Nixe, a military operation during World War II

See also 
 Nix (disambiguation)
 Nyx (disambiguation)
 Nixi (disambiguation)
 Nixie (disambiguation)